This is a list of prime ministers of Thailand by time in office. The basis of the list is the inclusive number of days from being sworn in until leaving office.

Rank by time in office 
Updated daily according to UTC.

See also 
 Prime Minister of Thailand
 List of prime ministers of Thailand

Notes

References

External links 

Thailand, prime minister
Lists related to prime ministers of Thailand